The 2006 Houston Dynamo season was the inaugural season of the club.

The team was created on December 15, 2005 when the San Jose Earthquakes were relocated, due to owner AEG's failure to secure a soccer-specific stadium. Even though all of San Jose's players and coaches moved to Houston, the team's name, logo, history and statistics were not transferred and remained inactive in San Jose thus making the Dynamo a new team, similar to the Baltimore Ravens in the NFL.

First season

The Dynamo played their first game on April 2, 2006. Amidst a crowd of 25,462 people in Robertson Stadium, the Dynamo beat the Colorado Rapids 5–2. Brian Ching led the charge for the Dynamo with four goals, all of which were set up with assists from teammate Dwayne De Rosario. In stoppage time, Alejandro Moreno scored MLS' Goal of the Week with a game-clinching bicycle kick. On May 6, 2006, the Houston Dynamo won their first intrastate rivalry game against FC Dallas, 4–3 at Robertson Stadium. Craig Waibel had a career year for the Dynamo, ending up one of the finalists for defender of the year. He logged 5 goals and 1 assist during the regular season. Ronald Cerritos and Julian Nash were released in June to make room for Paul Dalglish. 

Mike Chabala, Stuart Holden, Martin Hutton, Patrick Ianni, Mpho Moloi, Adrian Serioux, and Zach Wells were the new additions to the pre existing San Jose Earthquakes 2005 Roster. 

The Dynamo finished their first season in Houston with an 11–8–13 record, good for second place in the Western Conference. They lost the first game of the two-legged conference semifinal to C.D. Chivas USA, 2–1, on October 22 in Los Angeles. Chivas goalkeeper Brad Guzan stopped De Rosario on a penalty kick that could have tied the match.

In the second leg on October 29, Houston defeated Chivas USA 2–0 at Robertson Stadium, advancing in dramatic fashion. After a red card to Chivas' Juan Francisco Palencia, Houston's Brad Davis converted a second-half penalty kick to tie the aggregate score. With the match in second-half stoppage time, Brian Ching headed in the winning goal from close range to delight the crowd of more than 17,000.

On November 5, 2006, the Dynamo defeated the Colorado Rapids 3–1 in the Western Conference final to earn a spot in its first MLS Cup. Scottish forward Paul Dalglish scored twice in front of an MLS Cup Playoffs-high crowd of 23,107.

On November 12, 2006, the Dynamo defeated the New England Revolution 4–3 on penalty kicks after a 1–1 tie to win the 2006 MLS Cup held at Pizza Hut Park in Frisco, Texas. The game was scoreless until the second session of extra time, when New England's Taylor Twellman scored. Only one minute and six seconds later, Brian Ching headed in the tying goal for Houston, and the championship was, for the first time in MLS history, decided by a shootout. Substitutes Kelly Gray and Stuart Holden made Houston's first two penalty kicks, and standouts Dwayne De Rosario and Brian Ching made the last two. Ching's gave Houston a 4–3 lead, and goalkeeper Pat Onstad stopped New England's Jay Heaps on the final attempt to secure the win.

With the win, the Dynamo advanced to the 2007 CONCACAF Champions' Cup.

2006 Dynamo Squad
This is the final roster for the Houston Dynamo at the end of the 2006 Season.

Player movement 
Players who were with the Earthquakes at the end of the 2005 season and moved to Houston are not listed. Likewise, players who were with the Earthquakes and were released, retired, or out of contract after the 2005 season and did not move with the team to Houston are not listed.

In 
Per Major League Soccer and club policies terms of the deals do not get disclosed.

Out

Loans 
Per Major League Soccer and club policies terms of the deals do not get disclosed.

Out

Friendlies

Carolina Challenge Cup

Competitions

Major League Soccer

Standings

Western Conference

Overall

Matches

MLS Cup Playoffs

US Open Cup

Player Statistics

Appearances, goals, and assists 
{| class="wikitable sortable" style="text-align:center;"
|+
! rowspan="2" |No.
! rowspan="2" |Pos
! rowspan="2" |Nat
! rowspan="2" |
! colspan="3" |
! colspan="3" |
! colspan="3" |
! colspan="3" |
|-
!Apps
!Goals
!Assists
!Apps
!Goals
!Assists
!Apps
!Goals
!Assists
!Apps
!Goals
!Assists
|-
|1||GK||||align=left|||1||0||0||0||0||0||0||0||0||1||0||0
|-
|2||DF||||align=left|||32||4||4||25||2||3||4||0||1||3||2||0
|-
|3||DF||||align=left|||22||0||1||20||0||1||0||0||0||2||0||0
|-
|4||DF||||align=left|||2||0||0||0||0||0||0||0||0||2||0||0
|-
|5||DF||||align=left|||32||1||0||27||1||0||3||0||0||2||0||0
|-
|6||DF||||align=left|||22||0||0||18||0||0||2||0||0||3||0||0
|-
|7||MF||||align=left|||9||2||0||6||1||0||0||0||0||3||1||0
|-
|8||FW||||align=left|||10||4||1||6||2||1||4||2||0||0||0||0
|-
|9||MF||||align=left|||37||3||8||31||2||4||4||1||3||2||0||1
|-
|11||MF||||align=left|||34||2||14||28||1||11||4||1||2||2||0||1
|-
|12||FW||||align=left|||6||0||0||6||0||0||0||0||0||0||0||0
|-
|13||MF||||align=left|||36||2||4||31||2||3||3||0||1||2||0||0
|-
|14||MF||||align=left|||37||12||7||30||11||5||4||0||2||3||1||0
|-
|15||FW||||align=left|||37||6||7||30||3||6||4||0||1||3||3||0
|-
|16||DF||||align=left|||33||5||2||28||5||1||4||0||1||1||0||0
|-
|17||MF||||align=left|||0||0||0||0||0||0||0||0||0||0||0||0
|-
|18||GK||||align=left|||38||0||1||32||0||0||4||0||0||2||0||1
|-
|19||DF||||align=left|||4||0||0||2||0||0||0||0||0||2||0||0
|-
|20||FW||||align=left|||16||1||1||15||0||1||0||0||0||1||1||0
|-
|21||DF||||align=left|||0||0||0||0||0||0||0||0||0||0||0||0
|-
|22||MF||||align=left|||18||1||2||13||1||0||2||0||0||3||0||2
|-
|23||MF||||align=left|||0||0|||0||0||0||0||0||0||0||0||0||0
|-
|24||DF||||align=left|||28||0||3||31||0||3||4||0||0||3||0||0
|-
|25||FW||||align=left|||26||14||2||21||11||2||4||3||0||1||0||0
|-
|26||FW||||align=left|||1||0||0||0||0||0||0||0||1||0||0||0
|-
|30||GK||||align=left|||0||0||0||0||0||0||0||0||0||0||0||0
|-
|51||MF||||align=left|||27||1||0||20||1||0||4||0||0||3||0||0

Disciplinary record 
{| class="wikitable sortable" style="text-align:center;"
|+
! rowspan="2" |No.
! rowspan="2" |Pos
! rowspan="2" |Nat
! rowspan="2" |Player
! colspan="2" |Total
! colspan="2" |MLS
! colspan="2" |MLS Playoffs
! colspan="2" |US Open Cup
|-
!style="width:30px;"|
!style="width:30px;"|
!style="width:30px;"|
!style="width:30px;"|
!style="width:30px;"|
!style="width:30px;"|
!style="width:30px;"|
!style="width:30px;"|
|-
|2||DF||||align=left|Eddie Robinson||13||1||11||1||0||0||2||0
|-
|3||DF||||align=left|Kevin Goldthwaite||2||0||2||0||0||0||0||0
|-
|5||DF||||align=left|Ryan Cochrane||5||0||4||0||1||0||0||0
|-
|6||DF||||align=left|Kelly Gray||3||0||2||0||0||0||1||0
|-
|8||FW||||align=left|Paul Dalglish||3||0||3||0||0||0||0||0
|-
|9||MF||||align=left|Brian Mullan||6||1||6||1||0||0||0||0
|-
|11||MF||||align=left|Brad Davis||5||0||4||0||1||0||0||0
|-
|13||MF||||align=left|Ricardo Clark||6||1||4||1||2||0||0||0
|-
|14||MF||||align=left|Dwayne De Rosario||3||2||2||2||1||0||0||0
|-
|15||FW||||align=left|Alejandro Moreno||2||1||2||1||0||0||0||0
|-
|16||DF||||align=left|Craig Waibel||4||0||3||0||1||0||0||0
|-
|18||GK||||align=left|Pat Onstad||3||0||2||0||1||0||0||0
|-
|24||DF||||align=left|Wade Barrett||1||1||1||1||0||0||0||0
|-
|25||FW||||align=left|Brian Ching||2||0||1||0||0||0||1||0
|-
|51||MF||||align=left|Adrian Serioux||5||0||4||0||1||0||0||0

Honors and awards

MLS Player of the Week

MLS Player of the Month

Annual

Dynamo team awards

Uniforms

References

2006
Houston Dynamo
Houston
Houston Dynamo
MLS Cup champion seasons